Midden-Drenthe is a municipality in the northeastern Netherlands. The municipality was created in 1998, in a merger of the former municipalities of Beilen, Smilde, and Westerbork. Between 1998 and 2000, the name of the municipality was Middenveld.

Population centres 

The village of Westerbork gives its name to the Westerbork deportation and (later) concentration camp, located about 7 km north of the village, in the forests of Hooghalen.

The Westerbork Synthesis Radio Telescope (WSRT) array was installed near the site of the camp in 1969.

Notable people 
 Carry van Bruggen (1881 in Smilde - 1932) a Dutch writer
 Jacob Israël de Haan (1881 in Smilde – 1924 in Jerusalem) a Dutch-Jewish literary writer, jurist and journalist, killed by Haganah 
 Jan Hartman (1887 in Beilen – 1969) a Dutch fascist and collaborator during WWII 
 Hendrikje van Andel-Schipper (1890 in Smilde – 2005 in Hoogeveen) the oldest person ever from the Netherlands
 Hans Heyting (1918 near Beilen – 1992) a Dutch poet, playwright, radio personality, children's book writer and painter
 Henk Koning (1933 in Beilen – 2016) a Dutch politician
 Martin van Hees (born 1964 in Beilen) a Dutch philosopher and academic
 Eef van Breen (born 1978 in Westerbork) a Dutch jazz trumpeter, singer, arranger and composer

Sport 
 Jan Lomulder (born 1967 in Beilen) a Dutch former kickboxer
 Adelinde Cornelissen (born 1979 in Beilen) a Dutch dressage rider
 Jasper Iwema (born 1989 in Hooghalen) a Dutch motorcycle rider
 Laura Dijkema (born 1990 in Beilen) a Dutch volleyball player

References

External links
Official website

 
Municipalities of Drenthe
Municipalities of the Netherlands established in 2000